The  (FAI) is the world governing body for air sports, and also stewards definitions regarding human spaceflight.  It was founded on 14 October 1905, and is headquartered in Lausanne, Switzerland. It maintains world records for aeronautical activities, including ballooning, aeromodeling, and unmanned aerial vehicles (drones), as well as flights into space.

History 
The FAI was founded at a conference held in Paris 12–14 October 1905, which was organized following a resolution passed by the Olympic Congress held in Brussels on 10 June 1905 calling for the creation of an Association "to regulate the sport of flying, ... the various aviation meetings and advance the science and sport of Aeronautics." The conference was attended by representatives from 8 countries: Belgium (Aero Club Royal de Belgique, founded 1901), France (Aéro-Club de France, 1898), Germany (Deutscher Luftschiffer Verband aka "German Airship League", founded 1902), Great Britain (Royal Aero Club, 1901), Italy (Aero Club d'Italia, 1904), Spain (Real Aero Club de España, 1905), Switzerland (Aero-Club der Schweiz, 1900) and the United States (Aero Club of America, 1905).

On 2 February 2017 the FAI announced its new strategic partnership with international asset management firm Noosphere Ventures. FAI Secretary General Susanne Schödel, FAI President Frits Brink and Noosphere Ventures Managing Partner Max Polyakov signed the agreement, making Noosphere Ventures FAI's Global Technical Partner.

The FAI suspended Russia and Belarus due to the 2022 Russian invasion of Ukraine, as a result of which pilots from Russia and Belarus will not be able to compete in any FAI-sanctioned event in the 13 FAI air sports disciplines, including paragliding, hang gliding, and paramotoring.

Activities 
The FAI is the international governing body for the following activities: 
 Aerobatics through the FAI Aerobatics Commission (Commission Internationale de Voltige Aérienne – CIVA)
 Aeromodeling and drones through the FAI Aeromodelling Commission (Commission Internationale d'Aéro-Modélisme – CIAM)
 Ballooning through the FAI Ballooning Commission (Commission Internationale de l'Aérostation – CIA)
 General aviation through the FAI General Aviation Commission (General Aviation Commission – GAC)
 Gliding through the FAI Gliding Commission (International Gliding Commission – IGC)
 Hang gliding & Paragliding through the FAI Hang Gliding & Paragliding Commission (Commission Internationale de Vol Libre – CIVL)
 Human-powered aircraft through the FAI Amateur-Built and Experimental Aircraft Commission (Commission Internationale des Aéronefs de Construction Amateur – CIACA)
 Microlighting and Paramotoring through the FAI Microlight & Paramotor Commission (Commission Internationale de Microaviation – CIMA)
 Skydiving through the FAI International Skydiving Commission
 Rotorcraft through the FAI Rotorcraft Commission (Commission Internationale de giraviation – CIG)

The FAI establishes the standards for records in the activities.  Where these are air sports, the FAI also oversees international competitions at world and continental levels, and also organizes the World Air Games and FAI World Grand Prix.

The FAI organises the FAI International Drones Conference and Expo. This event offers a platform for organisations, businesses and individuals to discuss how drones are used today and to create a framework for how they will be used and impact on life in the future.

The FAI also keeps records set in human spaceflight, through the FAI Astronautic Records Commission (International Astronautic Records Commission – ICARE)

Karman Line definition 

Records 

Among the FAI's responsibilities are the verification of record-breaking flights. For a flight to be registered as a "World Record," it has to comply with the FAI's strict rules, which include a proviso that the record must exceed the previous record by a certain percentage. Since the late 1930s, military aircraft have dominated some classes of record for powered aircraft such as speed, distance, payload, and height, though other classes are regularly claimed by civilians.

Some records are claimed by countries as their own, even though their achievements fail to meet FAI standards.  These claims are not typically granted the status of official records. For example, Yuri Gagarin earned recognition for the first manned spaceflight, despite failing to meet FAI requirements. The FAI initially did not recognize the achievement because he did not land in his Vostok spacecraft (he ejected from it), but later it recognized that Gagarin was the first human to fly into space.  The FAI then established the Yuri A. Gagarin Gold Medal, which has been awarded since 1968.

Classes 

The following types of craft have records:
 Class A Free Balloons
 Class B Airships
 Class C Aeroplanes
 Class CS Solar-Powered Aeroplanes
 Class D Gliders & Motorgliders
 Class E Rotorcraft
 Class F Model Aircraft
 Class F1 – Free flight
 Class F2 – Control line
 Class F3 – Radio control
 F3K - Discus Launch Glider
 F3F - Slope Soaring
 Class F4 –  Scale model aircraft
 Class F5 –  Electrically powered model aircraft
 F5B – Electric powered motor gliders
 F5D – Electric powered pylon racing model aircraft
 Class F8 -   Autonomous flight (created by CIAM in 2006, later retired)
 Class G Parachuting
 Class H Vertical Take-off and Landing (VTOL) Aeroplanes
 Class I Manpowered aircraft
 Class K Spacecraft
 Class M Tilt-Wing/Tilt Engine Aircraft
 Class N Short Take-off and Landing (STOL) Aeroplanes
 Class O Hang Gliding & Paragliding
 Class P Aerospacecraft
 Class R Microlights and Paramotors
 Class S Space Models (Model rockets)
 Class U Unmanned aerial vehicles

Selected records

Awards 

The FAI Gold Air Medal was established in 1924 and was first awarded in 1925. It is reserved for those who have contributed greatly to the development of aeronautics by their activities, work, achievements, initiative or devotion to the cause of Aviation. The FAI has also awarded the Paul Tissandier Diploma since 1952 to those who have served the cause of aviation in general and sporting aviation in particular.

The FAI also makes awards for each of the following air sports.

 Awards for Ballooning:
 The Montgolfier Ballooning Diploma
 The Santos Dumont Gold Airship Medal
 Awards for General Aviation:
 The Charles Lindbergh General Aviation Diploma
 Awards for Gliding:
 The Lilienthal Gliding Medal
 The Pelagia Majewska Gliding Medal
 The Pirat Gehriger Diploma
 Awards for Rotorcraft:
 The FAI Gold Rotorcraft Medal
 Awards for Parachuting:
 The FAI Gold Parachuting Medal
 The Leonardo da Vinci Parachuting Diploma
 The Faust Vrancic Medal
 Awards for Aeromodelling:
 The FAI Aeromodelling Gold Medal
 The Andrei Tupolev Aeromodelling Medal
 The Alphonse Penaud Aeromodelling Diploma
 The Antonov Aeromodelling Diploma
 The Andrei Tupolev Aeromodelling Diploma
 The Frank Ehling Diploma
 Awards for Aerobatics:
 The Leon Biancotto Aerobatics Diploma
 Awards for Astronautics:
 The Yuri A. Gagarin Gold Medal
 The V.M. Komarov Diploma
 The Korolev Diploma
 The Odyssey Diploma
 Awards for Hang Gliding:
 The Pepe Lopes Medal
 The FAI Hang Gliding Diploma
 Awards for Microlight Aviation:
 The Colibri Diploma
 The Ann Welch Diploma
 Awards for Aviation and Space Education:
 The Nile Gold Medal
 Awards for Amateur-Built Aircraft:
 The Phoenix Diploma
 The Phoenix Group Diploma
 The Henri Mignet Diploma

FAI Young Artists Contest 
The FAI Young Artists Contest is an international painting competition for youngsters between the ages of 6 and 17. Each FAI Member Country organises the contest in their country, and the national winners are submitted to the International Jury each year.

Members

Active members

Associate members

Affiliate members

Temporary members

Suspended members

See also 
 Fédération Internationale de l'Automobile
 Fédération Internationale de Motocyclisme
 Hot air ballooning
 List of spaceflight records

References

External links 

 
 

 
1905 establishments in Switzerland
Aerobatic organizations
Aeronautics organizations
Air sports
Aviation organizations
Aviation records
Air sports
Organisations based in Lausanne
Sports organizations established in 1905
Standards organisations in Switzerland
World record databases